Loksatta (Lōksattā) is a Marathi daily newspaper in Maharashtra, India. It is published by The Indian Express Group and was launched on 14 January 1948. Loksatta is published out of Mumbai, Pune, Nagpur, Thane, Palghar, Ahmednagar, Amravati, Aurangabad and Nashik.

History
Established in 1948, on the Makar Sankranti day, Loksatta gained notability through coverage of Mahatma Gandhi's assassination and subsequent developments. The founder of the Indian Express Group, Ramnath Goenka, remained dedicated to Loksatta.

After remaining the largest circulated standard Marathi daily for many years, by the late-90s, Loksatta saw competition from newer daily newspapers like Maharashtra Times. By 1997, it only had a circulation of 400,000 in Mumbai, Pune, Ahmednagar and Nagpur combined.

However, Circulation increased in the 2000s after changes which included addition of various supplements and adding several new city editions for local news.

Editors
 T.V. Parvate
 S.R. Pendse
 H.R. Mahajani
 R. N. Late
 Vidyadhar Gokhale
 Madhav Yeshwant Gadkari
 Arun Tikekar
 Kumar Ketkar
Girish Kuber

News Editors 
Hari Apte
Tukaram Kokje
Aatmaram Shetye
Ramesh Zawar
Vishwanath More
Datta Panchwagh
Prashant Dixit

See also
 Jansatta
 Indian Express

References

External links
 Latest Marathi News  Official site
 Loksatta official site

Newspapers published in Mumbai
Marathi-language newspapers
Publications established in 1948
Newspapers published in Delhi
Indian Express Limited
1949 establishments in India